Todd Lowe (born May 10, 1977) is an American actor.  He is best known for his role as Terry Bellefleur, a PTSD-suffering Iraq War veteran who works as a short order cook at Merlotte's Bar & Grill on HBO's True Blood and as Zack Van Gerbig on Gilmore Girls. In 2017 he played the role of Colin Dobbs, another war veteran, in five episodes of the USA Network series Shooter, based on the 2007 film of the same name and the novel Point of Impact by Stephen Hunter.

In addition to television and film, Todd has starred in over twenty stage productions and has worked on several plays written by playwright Justin Tanner.

Lowe has been a singer and guitarist for Pilbilly Knights, a country-rock band based in Los Angeles.  The band released a compact disc, California Nigth Club (sic) in January 2007. He is currently a member of another rock country band, The LA Hootenanny.

Lowe is a graduate of The University of Texas at Austin graduating with a Bachelor of Fine Arts degree in 1999. While looking for jobs as an actor, Lowe worked as a substitute teacher.

Filmography

Film

Television

Video games

Awards and nominations

References

External links

1977 births
Living people
People from Humble, Texas
Male actors from Houston
American male film actors
American male television actors
20th-century American male actors
21st-century American male actors
University of Texas at Austin College of Fine Arts alumni